Kasai (written: 河西, 葛西 or 笠井) is a Japanese surname. Notable people with the surname include:

Akira Kasai (born 1952), Japanese politician
, Japanese ice hockey player
Jun Kasai (born 1974), Japanese professional wrestler
Ken'ichi Kasai, (born 1970), Japanese anime director
Kenji Kasai, Japanese table tennis player
Kenta Kasai (born 1985), Japanese football player
Kimiko Kasai (born 1945), retired Japanese jazz singer
Masae Kasai (1933–2013), former Japanese volleyball player
Morio Kasai (1922-2008), Japanese surgeon
Noriaki Kasai (born 1972), Japanese ski jumper
Tomomi Kasai (born 1991), Japanese singer, actress and a former member of the idol group AKB48
Yoshiko Yoshiizumi née Kasai (born 1980), Japanese ski jumper

See also
Kasai clan

Japanese-language surnames